Leptolambda is an extinct genus of pantodonts in the family Barylambdidae from North America.

References

Pantodonts
Paleocene mammals of North America
Prehistoric mammal genera